Clouds Over Borsk is a 1960 Soviet drama film directed by Vasili Ordynsky.

Plot 
The film tells about a lonely schoolgirl who decided to join the Pentecostal sect.

Cast 
 Inna Gulaya as Olya Ryzhkova
 Roman Khomyatov as Mitya Sayenko
 Vladimir Ivashov as Genka
 Natalya Antonova as Kira Sergeyevna
 Viktor Rozhdestvenskiy as Principal (as V. Rozhdestvenskiy)
 Pyotr Konstantinov as Olya's Father
 Pyotr Lyubeshkin as Bocharnikov
 Valentina Belyaeva as Mitya's Aunt
 Evgeniy Teterin as Artemiy Nikolayevich
 Anna Troitskaya as Melan'ya (as A. Troitskaya)
 Inna Churikova as Rayka
 Igor Okhlupin as German
 Gennadi Krasheninnikov as Obishkin
 Nikita Mikhalkov

References

External links 
 

1960 films
1960s Russian-language films
Soviet drama films
1960 drama films